Neermahal also known as Twijilikma Nuyung ( Literally: "Water Palace" ) is a former royal palace of Tripura Kingdom, built by Maharaja Bir Bikram Kishore Manikya bahadur in 1930. It is also the largest water palace in India. The palace is situated in the middle of Rudrasagar Lake ( Twijilikma ), in Melaghar 53 kilometers away from Agartala, the capital of Tripura.

History 
The ‘lake palace’ of Tripura, Neer-Mahal was constructed as a summer residence of the royal family. Maharaja Bir Bikram Kishore Manikya Debbarma built this palace in 1921,  he was belonged to the ‘Manikya Dynasty’ which is supposed to be the second longest remaining dynasty in the world today.

In 1921, the Maharaja commissioned the British company, Martin and Burns to build a unique water palace in the middle of Lake Rudrasagar. The lake palace was designed and built on detailed instructions from the Maharaja himself and blended Hindu and Mughal architectural styles. Marble and sandstone were used extensively and even today, the stand-out is the profusion of balconies, towers, pavilions and bridges. The dome- shaped minars that can be seen from far, also give the Neer Mahal a fort-like appearance. The palace is said to have taken nine years to build.

Architecture 

The palace is the largest of its kind in India and the only one in Eastern India. There are only two water palaces in India, the other one being the Jal Mahal in Rajasthan. However, the latter is significantly smaller in size than Neermahal.

The palace is divided into two parts. The western side of the palace is known as Andar Mahal. It was made for the royal family. The eastern side is an open-air theatre where drama, theatre, dance and other cultural events were organized for the enjoyment of Maharajas and their royal families. The palace has 24 rooms in total.

Neer-Mahal has two stairways inside leading down to a landing on the water of Rudrasagar Lake. Maharajas used to go to the palace by hand powered boat from ‘Rajghat’. On the ceiling, the palace houses one of the most beautiful terrace gardens of India, though poor maintenance and lack of exposure to tourists has led to the depletion of beauty and splendor.

Attraction 
Every year in the month of August a festival is observed by the locals called Neermahal Water Festival. The festival goes on for 3 days and many colourful cultural programme and event take place in the evening. One of the attraction of the Neermahal Water Festival is the boat race that happens in lake. Different kinds of boats participate in the competition. Apart from that, there's a swimming competition too which is organised during the festival.

Photography

References

Palaces in Tripura
Sipahijala district